Candice Holley (born April 23, 1981 in Memphis, Tennessee) is a women's college basketball athlete that played for The University of Cincinnati and University of Mississippi.

Early years 
As a high school star at White Station under Betty Parks, Holley garnered first team All-State accolades. She averaged 19.1 points and 15.3 rebounds per game as a senior and also earned All-District, All-Regional and District Player of the Year honors. Holley was ranked among the top 100 in the nation by the All-Star Girls Report coming out of high school and was a WBCA All-American before graduating in 1999.

Collegiate career 
Holley, a 6-1 forward, played for Cincinnati for two seasons (1999–2001) before transferring to Ole Miss in 2002. At Cincinnati, Holley earned Conference USA All-Freshman honors and finished third on the team in scoring. Holley earned Team Captain Honors while at Ole Miss.

References

External links
 http://espn.go.com/recruiting/s/ncwearly/2002.html
 http://enquirer.com/bearcats/2000/12/14/uc_holley_leaves_uc.html

1981 births
Living people
People from Memphis, Tennessee
American women's basketball players
21st-century American women